Poona or Pune is a metropolis in Maharashtra, India.

Poona may also refer to:

Places 
 Poona, Queensland, a town and locality in the Gympie Region, Queensland, Australia
 Poona Dam, in Queensland, Australia
 Poona National Park, in Queensland, Australia
 Poona (crater), impact crater on Mars

Other uses 
 Poona Ford (born 1995), American football player
 Poona, a competitive sport from which badminton has its origin

See also
 Poona Pact, an agreement reached in 1932 by B. R. Ambedkar and M. K. Gandhi for fair representation of Indian depressed classes in legislative assemblies of British India
 Puna (disambiguation)
 Pune (disambiguation)
 Poon (disambiguation)